Cyclophorus fulguratus is a species of small land snail with an operculum, terrestrial pulmonate gastropod mollusc in the family Cyclophoridae.

References

Cyclophorus (gastropod)